Margaret (Marie) Dare (4 February 1902 - 11 February 1976) was born in Newport-on-Tay, Scotland. She is known for cello performance and chamber composition. She died in Edinburgh, Scotland.

Education 
Dare studied cello performance and composition at the Guildhall School of Music. While there, she studied under Warwick Evans, and W H Squire. Dare later continued her studies in Paris. While in Paris, she studied under Paul Bezelair and Benjamin Dale alongside fellow pupil Margaret Hubicki.

Second World War 
During World War II, Dare enlisted in the Women's Royal Naval Service.

Career 
As a teenager, Dare performed in the Victory Concert at the Royal Albert Hall. After serving in World War II, she performed as principle cellist in the Reid Orchestra. She performed recitals in Budapest, London, and Vienna. In her later years, she performed in the Scottish Trio. She worked as a professor of Cello at RSAMD.

Honors 
Dare received Composition Prizes and the Women Musicians Composition Prize (for Piano Trio) during her career, as well as the Gold Medal for Instrumentalists and the Sir Landon Ronald Prize during her schooling.

Compositions 
Some of Dare's Compositions are titled:

 Aria
 Chant
 Elegy
 A Widow Bird State Mourning
 Day-Dream A
 Lac, Le
 Menuet
 Nocturne
 Phantasy String Quartet
 Raasay
 Rhapsody
 Rhapsody for double bass and orchestra
 Rustic Dance
 Spanish Shawl, The
 Three Highland Sketches
 Two Pastorales
 Valse

External links 
 https://www.cambridge.org/core/books/the-new-biographical-dictionary-of-scottish-women/E7407E5276D61ED07E2A9EBA962D9BE5
 https://britishmusiccollection.org.uk/composer/marie-dare
 https://www.scottishmusiccentre.com/marie-dare

References 

1902 births
1976 deaths
Scottish cellists
Scottish composers
20th-century cellists